"" ("The Nigerien") is the national anthem of Niger. The lyrics are by Maurice Albert Thiriet; Robert Jacquet and Nicolas Abel François Frionnet wrote the music. It was adopted as Niger's anthem in 1961.

History 
The anthem was written by French film composer Maurice Albert Thiriet. The music was composed by two other Frenchmen, Robert Jacquet and Nicolas Abel François Frionnet. It was adopted in 1961, a year after Niger gained independence from France.

On 21 November 2019, President Mahamadou Issoufou announced that he had decided to change the national anthem. The decision followed criticism that some of the lyrics appeared to express gratitude to the former coloniser, France, with Nigeriens on social media challenging lines three and four. A committee chaired by Prime Minister Brigi Rafini was "charged with reflecting on the current anthem by providing corrections" and "if possible find a new anthem that responds to the current context of Niger". Created in 2018, it was composed of several members of the Government and about fifteen "experts experienced in writing and musical composition". For Assamana Malam Issa, Minister of Cultural Renaissance, "We must find a hymn that can galvanize the population, be for us a kind of war cry to touch our patriotic fiber".

Lyrics

French original

Translations

References

Notes

External links
 Niger: La Nigérienne - Audio of the national anthem of Niger, with information and lyrics (archive link)
 nationalanthems.info has lyrics, with an English translation.

Media
 Vocal version (Recording from a radio station) Anthem finishes at 1:47

African anthems
Nigerien music
National symbols of Niger
National anthem compositions in F major